Emma Jane Edwards (born 26 September 1971) is a British born, Falkland Islands teacher and politician, who served as a Member of the Legislative Assembly for the Stanley constituency from her election in 2009 until she resigned in 2011. She is the eldest daughter of another MLA, Roger Edwards.

Edwards was born in Portsmouth, England to Norma (a Falkland Islander) and Roger Edwards. She first went to the Falklands at the age of two when her father was stationed aboard HMS Endurance. Edwards was educated in Stanley, but in 1988 she moved to Winchester to undertake A-Levels and in 1995 she graduated from Queen's University Belfast with a degree in Geology.

After working for some years as a junior geologist for the Falkland Islands Government, Edwards went to Aberdeen University in 1998 where she gained a master's degree in Petroleum Geology. She then worked for the Falkland Islands Development Corporation and Cable & Wireless before returning to the UK in 2004 where she went to the University of Exeter to retrain as a school teacher.

In November 2009 she was elected to the Legislative Assembly for Stanley, and in June 2010 she represented the Falklands at the annual meeting of the UN Special Committee on Decolonisation in New York City.

Edwards is a reserve Police Constable in the Royal Falkland Islands Police and her portfolios as an MLA included Tourism, Minerals, Housing and Environment and Heritage. She announced her resignation from the Legislative Assembly in 2011, following her decision to marry Mark Brook. Her seat was filled in a by-election on 15 December 2011, won by Barry Elsby.

References

1971 births
Living people
Alumni of the University of Aberdeen
Alumni of Queen's University Belfast
Alumni of the University of Exeter
Falkland Islands MLAs 2009–2013
Falkland Islands schoolteachers
Politicians from Portsmouth
English emigrants to the Falkland Islands
Falkland Islands women in politics
21st-century British women politicians